Muru Jaqhi (Aymara muru truncated, jaqhi cliff, "truncated cliff", Hispanicized spelling Morojaque) is a  mountain in the Andes of southern Peru, about  high. It is situated in the Puno Region, Puno Province, Pichacani District. Kunturiri lies northeast of the mountain Wankarani and southeast of Ninachiri and Kunturiri.

References

Mountains of Puno Region
Mountains of Peru